Tugaila Land District is a land district (cadastral division) of Western Australia, located within the Eastern Land Division in the Gibson Desert. It spans roughly 24°00'S - 26°50'S in latitude and 123°20'E - 125°50'E in longitude.

History
The district was created on 3 February 1932, and was defined in the Government Gazette:

References

Land districts of Western Australia